WOTE (1380 AM) is a radio station broadcasting a sports format with programming from ESPN Radio. Licensed to Clintonville, Wisconsin, United States, the station is currently owned by Results Broadcasting, Inc. and features programming from ABC Radio and Jones Radio Network.

History
The station was assigned the call letters WRJQ on June 8, 1981.  On December 29, 1982, the station changed its call sign to WFCL and, on September 29, 2008, to the current WOTE.

References

External links

OTE
Sports radio stations in the United States
Radio stations established in 1981
1981 establishments in Wisconsin